Michael Bracewell may refer to:

 Michael Bracewell (cricketer) (born 1991), New Zealand cricketer
 Michael Bracewell (writer) (born 1958), British writer and novelist